Lincoln is a 1906 four-act historical play by the American actor Benjamin Chapin, known as an Abraham Lincoln impersonator. It portrays key events from the life of the assassinated president.

It appeared with Chapin in the title role, at the Liberty Theatre on Broadway where it followed straight on from Thomas Dixon Jr.'s controversial The Clansman, which glorified the Ku Klux Klan. The New York Times considered Chapin's play as "an antidote" to the previous production.

Elements of the play were later used in the 1917 The Lincoln Cycle of silent films starring Chapin.

References

Bibliography
 Bruce Babington & Charles Barr. The Call of the Heart: John M. Stahl and Hollywood Melodrama. Indiana University Press, 2018.

1906 plays
Plays set in the 19th century
American plays
Broadway plays
Cultural depictions of Abraham Lincoln